Factory Green, Inc., was an American, eco-friendly clothing and accessories online retail store and was based in Columbia, Missouri. Factory Green was co-founded in 2007 by Daniel Lyons, CEO, and Jack Short, President and Chairman. The company focused on offering "urban and trendy" environmentally friendly apparel, accessories, and apartment wares, marketing specifically to the college-aged demographic.  The company offered both organic cotton and bamboo apparel manufactured in facilities running solely on wind and solar power. Factory Green donated a portion of its revenue to the United Nations Water For Life organization which provides clean water to under-served populations around the globe.

Factory Green shipped to the United States, Canada, Australia, the United Kingdom, and Europe.

History 
Factory Green was founded by University of Missouri undergraduates, who got the idea for the company from their study abroad experiences in Europe.

Philosophy
Factory Green aimed to take the environmental movement to a new generation of socially aware consumers, enabling them to live and wear the green lifestyle, and change the world through reducing their environmental impact.

Customer Base and Apparel 
Factory Green had been described as selling artistic, edgy, and fashion-forward merchandise; for example, T-shirts emblazoned with the words "Go Organic" or "Carbon Free" and organic cotton tote bags that read "F*@k Plastic." One newspaper claims that "There are few businesses out there that can combine trendy clothes, savvy accessories and contemporary products with a plan to save the environment."

According to the internet blog, TreeHugger.com, Factory Green is a "company about hope and change, and the ability of young-people to do something to turn things around." The Factory Green website goes on to say that "The Going Green movement is about... reducing environmental impact" and that "the youth of this world... must demand for industry to not only recognize its destructive impact, but to force its change."

Factory Green's graphic apparel was designed by University of Missouri fashion and design students. The blank organic cotton and bamboo T-shirts and hoodies were produced in small facilities in India which run on wind and solar power and are constructed by fair trade workers.

References

External links
 Factory Green's official website

Online clothing retailers of the United States
Companies based in Columbia, Missouri